Ellie Harrison may refer to:

Ellie Harrison (artist) (born 1979), British artist
Ellie Harrison (journalist) (born 1977), English journalist best known for her television wildlife work